The 1970 U.S. Clay Court Championships was a combined men's and women's tennis tournament that was part of the Grand Prix. It was held at the Woodstock Country Club in Indianapolis, Indiana in the United States and played on outdoor clay courts. It was the 2nd edition of the tournament in the Open Era and was held in from 27 July through 2 August. Cliff Richey and Linda Tuero won the singles titles.

Finals

Men's singles
 Cliff Richey defeated  Stan Smith 6–2, 10–8, 3–6, 6–1

Women's singles
 Linda Tuero defeated  Gail Chanfreau 7–5, 6–1

Men's doubles
 Clark Graebner /  Arthur Ashe defeated  Ilie Năstase /  Ion Țiriac 2–6, 6–4, 6–4

Women's doubles
 Rosie Casals /  Gail Chanfreau defeated  Helen Gourlay /  Pat Walkden 6–2, 6–2

References

External links 
 ATP Tournament profile
 ITF Tournament details

U.S. Men's Clay Court Championships
U.S. Men's Clay Court Championships
U.S. Men's Clay Court Championships
U.S. Men's Clay Court Championships
U.S. Men's Clay Court Championships
U.S. Men's Clay Court Championships
U.S. Men's Clay Court Championships